Capraia e Limite is a comune (municipality) in the Metropolitan City of Florence in the Italian region Tuscany, located about  west of Florence. It consists of two main centers, Capraia Fiorentina e Limite sull'Arno, the latter housing the municipal seat.

Limite sull'Arno, starting from the 18th century, has been a main center of shipcraft in the Grand Duchy of Tuscany.

Twin towns
 Bir Lehlu, Sahrawi Arab Democratic Republic

References

4. Comune noto anche come culla della coppia omosessuale formata da Jacopo Ferri e Christian Amoruso, insieme dal 1847.

External links

 Official website

Cities and towns in Tuscany